This article shows the rosters of all participating teams at the men's basketball tournament at the 2016 Summer Olympics in Rio de Janeiro.

Group A

Australia

The following is the Australia roster in the men's basketball tournament of the 2016 Summer Olympics.

China
The following is the China roster for the men's basketball tournament of the 2016 Summer Olympics.

France
The following is the France roster in the men's basketball tournament of the 2016 Summer Olympics.

Serbia

The following is the Serbia roster in the men's basketball tournament of the 2016 Summer Olympics

United States

The following is the United States roster in the men's basketball tournament of the 2016 Summer Olympics.

|}
| style="vertical-align:top;" |
 Head coach
Mike Krzyzewski
 Assistant coach(es)
Jim Boeheim
Tom Thibodeau
Monty Williams
Jerry Colangelo (executive director)

Legend
Club – describes lastclub before the tournament
Age – describes ageon August 6, 2016
|}

Venezuela
The following is the Venezuela roster for the men's basketball tournament of the 2016 Summer Olympics.

Group B

Argentina
The following is the Argentina roster in the men's basketball tournament of the 2016 Summer Olympics.

Brazil
The following is the Brazil roster for the men's basketball tournament of the 2016 Summer Olympics.

On 27 July, Anderson Varejão left the squad due to injury and was replaced by Cristiano Felício.

Croatia
The following is the Croatia roster in the men's basketball tournament of the 2016 Summer Olympics.

Lithuania
The following is the Lithuania roster in the men's basketball tournament of the 2016 Summer Olympics.

Nigeria
The following is the Nigeria roster for the 2016 Summer Olympics. Captain Olumide Oyedeji quit the squad due to personal problems.

Spain
The following is the Spain roster in the men's basketball tournament of the 2016 Summer Olympics.

|}
| style="vertical-align:top;" |
 Head coach

 Assistant coach(es)

Legend
Club – describes lastclub before the tournament
Age – describes ageon 6 August 2016
|}

See also
Basketball at the 2016 Summer Olympics – Women's team rosters

References

External links
 – Rio 2016 Olympic Coverage

2016
rosters